Rita May may refer to:

 "Rita May" (song), a 1975 song by Bob Dylan
 Rita May (actress) (born 1942), British actress

See also
Rita Mae Brown (born 1944), American writer